The 1914 Washington and Lee Generals football team represented Washington and Lee University as a member of the South Atlantic Intercollegiate Athletic Association (SAIAA) during the 1914 college football season. Led by Jogger Elcock in his first year as head coach, the Generals compiled an undefeated, 9–0 record (3–0 SAIAA) and winning the SAIAA title. The team outscored its opponents 324 to 12.

Tackle Ted Shultz was selected an All-American by the Philadelphia Public Ledger. College Football Hall of Fame inductee Harry "Cy" Young was in the backfield. Edward Donahue was later a coach.

Schedule

References

Washington And Lee
Washington and Lee Generals football seasons
College football undefeated seasons
South Atlantic Intercollegiate Athletic Association football champion seasons
Washington And Lee Generals Football